Heinz Schäfer (17 March 1950 – 13 July 1983) was a German wrestler. He competed in the men's Greco-Roman 100 kg at the 1976 Summer Olympics.

References

1950 births
1983 deaths
German male sport wrestlers
Olympic wrestlers of West Germany
Wrestlers at the 1976 Summer Olympics
People from Recklinghausen (district)
Sportspeople from Münster (region)